Zika, or Zika fever, is an illness caused by the Zika virus.

Zika or Žika may also refer to:

 Zika virus, a member of the Flaviviridae virus family
 Zika Forest, a forest in Uganda
 Zika rabbit, a breed of rabbit

People

Surname

 Adolf Zika (born 1972), Czech photographer
 Damouré Zika (1923–2009), Nigerian traditional healer, broadcaster and film actor
 Robert Zika (born 1930), Swiss sprint canoeist

Given name

 Zika Ascher (1910–1992), Czech artist and designer
 Žika Jelić, bassist for Serbian rock band YU Grupa
 Žika Milenković (musician), member of Serbian rock band Bajaga i Instruktori
 Žika Mitrović (1921–2005), Serbian and Yugoslav film director and screenwriter
 Žika Petrović (1939–2000), Serbian engineer and business executive
 Žika Rafajlović (1871–1953), Serbian politician

Nickname

 Živojin Milovanović (1884–1905), soldier and member of the Serbian Chetnik Organization
 Živojin Pavlović (1933–1998), Serbian film director and writer
 Živojin Tamburić (born 1957), Serbian comics critic, editor, and publisher
 Srđan Todorović (born 1965), Serbian actor and musician
 Vuča Žikić (died 1808), builder of the Deligrad fortification in the First Serbian Uprising, named Captain Žika

See also
 Foolish Years, a Yugoslav movie series known informally as Žika's Dynasty
 Zika virus outbreak, a list of outbreaks
 2015–16 Zika virus epidemic
 Zica (disambiguation)